The 2005–06 Maltese FA Trophy (known as U*BET FA Trophy for sponsorship reasons) was the 68th season since its establishment. The competition started on 5 November 2005 and ended on 26 May 2006 with the final, which Hibernians won 1-0 against Floriana.

First round

|colspan="3" style="background:#fcc;"|5 November 2005

|-
|colspan="3" style="background:#fcc;"|6 November 2005

|-
|colspan="3" style="background:#fcc;"|12 November 2005

|-
|colspan="3" style="background:#fcc;"|13 November 2005

|}

Second round

|colspan="3" style="background:#fcc;"|18 February 2006

|-
|colspan="3" style="background:#fcc;"|19 February 2006

|}

Quarter-finals

|colspan="3" style="background:#fcc;"|8 April 2006

|-
|colspan="3" style="background:#fcc;"|9 April 2006

|}

Semi-finals

Final

References

External links
 RSSSF page

Malta
Maltese FA Trophy seasons
Cup